The following are complete rosters for the twelve men's water polo teams that competed in the 1984 Summer Olympics water polo tournament played in August 1984. Each team registered 13 players which are ordered by their respective team numbers. Players marked with † were unused throughout the tournament. Names of coaches are taken from the official Olympics report. Player ages are correct as of 1 August 1984, the starting day of the tournament.

Group A

Canada
The following players represented Canada:

Head coach:  Gabor Csepregi

China
The following players represented China:

Head coach: Pens

Netherlands
The following players represented the Netherlands:

Head coach:  Dénes Pócsik

Yugoslavia
The following players represented Yugoslavia:

Head coach:  Ratko Rudić

Group B

Brazil
The following players represented Brazil:

Head coach: Carvalho

Greece
The following players represented Greece:

Head coach: Zographos

Spain
The following players represented Spain:

Head coach: Pujol

United States
The following players represented the United States:

Head coach:  Monte Nitzkowski

Group C

Australia
The following players represented Australia:

Head coach:  Tom Hoad

Italy
The following players represented Italy:

Head coach:  Fritz Dennerlein

Japan
The following players represented Japan:

Head coach: Kiyohara

West Germany
The following players represented West Germany:

Head coach:  Nico Firoiu

References

1984 Summer Olympics